Oryzias celebensis, the Celebes medaka, fish in the family Adrianichthyidae. It is endemic to rivers, streams and lakes on the Indonesian island of Sulawesi (formerly Celebes) and one river in East Timor.

Environment
Oryzias celebensis is commonly found in a freshwater environment within a benthopelagic depth range. They are native to a tropical climate. It has been recorded in coastal ponds with a tidal influence as well as in narrow, forested rivers.

Size
Oryzias celebensis can reach the maximum length of about 4.5 centimeters or about 1.77 inches as an unsexed male.

Distribution
Oryzias celebensis is found in Sulawesi and East Timor.

Biology
Oryzias celebensis is recorded to be a non-annual breeder. This species can be kept in an aquarium, but it is very difficult.

Naming
This species was described as Haplochilus celebensis by M.C.W. Weber in 1984 with the type locality given as Makassar, Maros River near Maros, Sulawesi.

References

celebensis
Freshwater fish of Indonesia
Fauna of Timor
Taxa named by Max Carl Wilhelm Weber
Fish described in 1894
Taxonomy articles created by Polbot